Paul Culpin (born 8 February 1962 in Kirby Muxloe, Leicestershire) is an English former footballer who played as a striker for Nuneaton Borough, Coventry City, Northampton Town, Peterborough United and Hereford United. He also played abroad, representing Grankulla IFK over three different spells in the Finnish First Division.

References

External links
 

1962 births
Living people
English footballers
English expatriate footballers
Expatriate footballers in Finland
Nuneaton Borough F.C. players
Coventry City F.C. players
Northampton Town F.C. players
Hereford United F.C. players
Peterborough United F.C. players
Kirby Muxloe F.C. players
Grankulla IFK players
Association football forwards